The discography of Japanese pop rock band Glay consists of sixteen studio albums, forty-two unique singles, twenty-seven video albums, and sixty-four songs associated with various promotions.

Discography 
All sales numbers are obtained from Oricon charts.

Albums 
{| class="wikitable"
!Album #
!width="220px"|Album information
!Album track list
|-
|1st
|Hai to Diamond (灰とダイヤモンド)
 Released: 05-25-1994 (re-released: 09-13-2000)
 Label: Extasy Records
 Highest oricon position (weekly): #57 
 Weeks on chart: 12
 Sales: 51,370
|01. Manatsu no Tobira (Glay Version)02. Kanojo no "Modern..."03. Kissin' Noise04. Hidoku Arifureta White Noise wo Kure05. Rain (Glay Version)06. Lady Close07. Two Bell Silence08. Sen no Knife ga Mune wo Sasu09. Burst10. If: Hai to Diamond
|-
|2nd
|Speed Pop
 Released: 03-01-1995 
 Label: Platinum Records
 Highest oricon position (weekly): #8
 Weeks on chart: 51
 Sales: 320,150
|01. Speed Pop (Introduction)02. Happy Swing03. Kanojo no "Modern..."04. Zutto Futari de...05. Love Slave06. Regret07. Innocence08. Freeze My Love09. Manatsu no Tobira10. Life: Touii Kara no Shita de11. Junk Art12. Rain
|-
|3rd
|Beat Out!
 Released: 02-07-1996
 Label: Platinum Records
 Highest oricon position (weekly): #1
 Weeks on chart: 83
 Sales: 821,890
|01. More Than Love02. Yes, Summerdays03. Genshoku no Sora04. Trouble on Monday05. Together06. Tsuki ni Inoru07. Ikiteku Tsuyosa08. Shuumatsu no Baby Talk09. Glorious10. Kisaki no Hate11. Miki Piano
|- 
|4th
|Beloved
 Released: 11-18-1996
Label: Platinum Records
Highest oricon position (weekly): #1
Weeks on chart: 89
Sales: 1,522,540
|01. Groovy Tour02. Lovers Change Fighters, Cool03. Beloved04. Shutter Speed No Theme05. Fairy Story06. Kanariya07. Hit the World Chart!08. A Boy: Zutto Wasurenai09. Haru wo Aisuru Hito10. Curtain Call11. Miyako Wasure12. Rhapsody
|- 
|5th
|Pure Soul
Released: 07-29-1998
Label: Unlimited Records / Mustard
Highest oricon position (weekly): #1
Weeks on chart: 41
Sales: 2,427,010
|01. You May Dream02. Biribiri Crashmen03. May Fair04. Soul Love05. Deatte Shimatta Futari 06. Pure Soul07. Yuuwaku08. Come On!!09. Friedchicken & Beer10. 3 Nen Go11. I'm in Love
|- 
|6th
|Heavy Gauge
Released: 10-20-1999
Label: Unlimited Records / Mustard
Highest oricon position (weekly): #1
Weeks on chart: 19
Sales: 2,366,000
|01. Heavy Gauge02. Fatsounds03. Survival04. Kokodewanai, Dokoka e05. Happiness06. Summer FM07. Level Devil08. Be with You09. Winter, Again10. Will Be King11. Ikigai12. Savile Row 3 Banchi
|- 
|7th
|One Love
Released: 11-28-2001
Label: Unlimited Records / Mustard
Highest oricon position (weekly): #1
Weeks on chart: 11
Sales: 661,460
|01. All Standard Is You02. Wet Dream03. Shitto (Kurid/Phantom mix)04. Highway No.505. Fighting Spirit06. Hitohira no Jiyuu (Johnny's peace mix)07. Think ABout My Daughter08. Viva Viva Viva09. Prize10. Mermaid11. Mister Popcorn12. Denki Iruka Kimyou na Shikou13. Stay Tuned14. Kimi ga Mitsumeta Umi15. Muyuu Byou16. Christmas Ring17. Global Communication18. One Love: All Standard Is You Reprise
|- 
|8th
|Unity Roots and Family, Away
Released: 09-19-2002
Label: Unlimited Records / Mustard
Highest oricon position (weekly): #1
Weeks on chart: 16
Sales: 436,179
|01. We All Feel His Strength of Tender02. Mata Kokode Aimashou03. Girlish Moon04. Way of Difference05. Koukai06. Yuruginai Monotachi07. Natsu no Kanata e (Johny the Unity mix)08. Neverland09. Karera no Holy X'mas10. Father & Son11. Sotsugyou Made, Ato Sukoshi12. Friend of Mine13. All Standard Is You: End Roll
|- 
|9th
|The Frustrated
Released: 03-24-2004
Label: Unlimited Records / Mustard
Highest oricon position (weekly): #2
Weeks on chart: 15
Sales: 241,485
|01. HighCommunications02. The Frustrated03. All I Want04. Beautiful Dreamer05. Blast06. Ano Natsu Kara Ichiban Tooi Basho07. Mugen no déjà vu Kara08. Toki no Shizuku09. Billionaire Champagne Miles Away10. Coyote, Colored Darkness11. Bugs in My Head12. Runaway Runaway13. Street Life14. Minamigochi
|- 
|10th
|Love Is BeautifulReleased: 01-31-2007
Label: Toshiba EMI / Capitol Records
Highest oricon position (weekly): #1
Weeks on chart: 9
Sales: 193,526
|01. Rock'N'Roll Swindle02. Henna Yume: Thousand Dreams03. 100 Mankai no Kiss04. Natsuoto05. American Innovation06. Answer07. Bokutachi no Shouhai08. Saragi no Tou09. World's End10. Scream11. Koi12. I Will13. Layla14. Mirror
|- 
|11th
|Glay
Released: 10-13-2010
Label: For Life Music / Lover Soul Music & Associates
Highest oricon position (weekly): #1
Weeks on chart: 14
Sales: 125,081

|01. Shikina02. Kegarenaki Season03. Wasted Time04. Haruka05. Apologize06. Tsuki no Yoru ni07. Kaze no Hitori08. Precious09. Satellite of Love10. Chelsea
|-
|12th
|Justice
Released: 01-23-2013
Label: Pony Canyon / Lover Soul Music & Associates
Highest oricon position (weekly): #1
Weeks on chart: 11
Sales: 73,925

|01. Who Killed Ny Diva02. Route 5 Bayshore Line03. Paradise Lost04. Love Impossible05. Mahiru no Tsuki no Shizukesa ni06. Gestalt07. Justice [from] Guilty08. Kizu Darake no Taiyou09. Unmeiron10. Smile 
|-
|13th
|Guilty
Released: 01-23-2013
Label: Pony Canyon / Lover Soul Music & Associates
Highest oricon position (weekly): #2
Weeks on chart: 10
Sales: 72,473

|01. Red Moon & Silver Sun ~ My Private "Jealousy"02. everKrack (album ver.)03. Factory04. Fuyu no Yuhodou05. Hana yo Arashi yo 06. Kiri no Naka (album ver.)07.Hatsukoi wo Utae08. Bible09. Ruby's Blanket10. Kimi ni Aetara
|-
|13th
|Music Life
Released: 11-05-2014
Label: Pony Canyon / Lover Soul Music & Associates
Highest oricon position (weekly): #2
Weeks on chart: 20
Sales: 89,923

|1. "Bleeze"2. "Hyakka Ryoran"3. "Only Yesterday"4. "Hashire! Mirai" 5. "Matsuri no Ato"6. "Uwaki na Kiss Me Girl"7. "Mousou Collector"8. "Hospital pm9"9. "Dark River"10. "Till Kingdom Come"11. "Music Life"
|-
|14th
|Summerdelics
Released: 07-12-2017
Label: Pony Canyon
Highest Oricon position (weekly): #1
Weeks on chart: 22
Sales: 71,372

|1. "Sin Zombie"2. "Binetsu Agirl Summer"3. "XYZ"4. "Chou Onsoku Destiny" 5. "Long Run"6. "The Other End of the Globe"7. "Deathtopia"8. "Heroes"9. "Summerdelics"10. "Sora ga Aozora de Aru Tame ni"11. "Scoop"12. "Seija no Inai Machi"13. "Supernova Express 2017"14. "Lifetime"
|-
|15th
|No Democracy
Released: 02-10-2019
Label: Pony Canyon
Highest Oricon position (weekly): #2
Sales: 39,153
|1. REIWADEMOCRACY2. Hansei no iro nashi3. My name is DATURA4. Flowers Gone 5. Koori no tsubasa6. Daremoga tokubetsudatta koro7. Ah, mujou8. Senka no ko9. JUST FINE10. Hajimari no uta11. Anata to ikite yuku12. COLORS13. Urei no Prisoner14. Gengou
|-
|16th
|Freedom Only
Released: 06-10-2021
Label: Pony Canyon
Highest Oricon position (weekly): #1
Sales: 30,738
|
|}

 Compilations, etc. 

 Singles 

Approximately total single sales (including video single "Survival", DVD single "Itsuka" and collaboration singles "Scream" and "Answer"): 20.451.156' Videos 

DVD sales information is incomplete and may not be up-to-date.

Tie up songs
Rain (1994): ending theme of anime "Yamato Takeru".
Manatsu no Tobira (真夏の扉) (1994): opening theme of anime "Yamato Takeru".
Freeze My Love： opening theme of TV Asahi's sport show "Ring no Tamashii".
Zutto Futtari de…(ずっと2人で…)： ending theme of TV Asahi's "Channel ninety nine".
Gone with the Wind: opening theme of NHK-BS2's animation "Biker Mice from Mars".
Yes, Summerdays：Miki's "Camelia Diamond" commercial movie.
Ikitekutsuyosa (生きてく強さ)：opening theme of TV Asahi's variety show "Kazeona Downtown". 
Glorious (グロリアス)："Victoria" commercial movie.
Together：mizuno commercial movie.
Beloved：theme song for TBS's drama "ひと夏のプロポーズ"/"Hokkaido Shumbun Press" commercial movie.
a Boy - zutto wasurenai (〜ずっと忘れない〜)：ending theme of NHK's show Pop Jam.
Groovy Tour：Mitsubishi Motors "Pajero Jr." commercial movie Song.
Kuchibiru (口唇)：ending theme of Fuji Television's show "Hey!Hey!Hey! Music Champ".
However： theme of TBS drama "Ryakudatsu Ai - Abunai Onna (略奪愛・アブない女)".
Yūwaku (誘惑)：TDK's Mini Disc campaign song.
Soul Love： Kanebo Ltd. "Bronze Love Summer '98" campaign song.
You May Dream：Meiji Seika chocolate cookie "Horn" commercial movie song.
pure soul：TDK's mini disc campaign song.
Be With You: theme song of Fuji Television's drama "Tabloid".
Winter, again：East Japan Railway Company's "Jr Ski Ski" commercial movie song.
Survival (サバイバル): opening theme of TV Tokyo's anime Kaikan Phrase.
kokodewanai, dokokae (ここではない、どこかへ)：theme song of Fuji Television's drama "Perfect Love".
Ikigai  (生きがい)：TDK's digital media commercial movie song.
Will Be King：Meiji Seika's "Fran" commercial song.
Fatsounds：Meiji Seika's "Horn" commercial song.
Happiness：theme song of TBS Television drama "Sanyoubino koibitotachie (金曜日の恋人たちへ)".
Tomadoi (とまどい)：theme song of TBS's show "Mirai Nikki VII".
Special Thanks：theme song of the movie"Mirai Nikki (未来日記)".
Global Communication：KDDI's "M-up Glay Phone" commercial movie song.
Stay Tuned：Nifty's "Broadband@nifty" CM song.
Shitto (嫉妬): "Glay Life Mastercard" CM song.
Fighting Spirit："Santory Diet" CM song.
Kimiga Mitsumeta Umi (君が見つめた海)："20 years of blood donation campaign" CM song.
Way of Difference：theme song of Fuji Television's "Ainori".
Mata kokode aimashou (またここであいましょう)：Japan Airlines "Jal New China" CM song.
Aitai Komochi (逢いたい気持ち)：theme song of TV Asahi's drama "Satorare".
Kōkai (航海)："Glay Life Mastercard Beijing Memorial Type" CM song.
Shiawase ni naru, sono toki ni (幸せになる、その時に): theme song of TBS drama "Seiji Echiro".
Itsuka (いつか)：theme song of TBS Television drama『 "Seiji Echiro (刑事☆イチロー).
Beautiful Dreamer and Tenshi no Wakemae (天使のわけまえ)：Suzuki/Chevrolet Cruise CM song
Street Life：NTT DoCoMo CM song
Toki no Shizuku  (時の雫): theme song of TV Asahi's drama "Sky High 2"
Billionaire Champagne Miles Away：WOWOW channel's Europe Soccer image song.
Runaway Runaway： Life Card CM song.
Minamigochi (南東風)：WOWOW channel 2004 Summer Campaign song
Peak Hateshinaku Soul Kagirinaku (ピーク果てしなく ソウル限りなく)：WOWOW CM song.
Blue Jean：TBC 2004 Summer Campaign CM song.
(Unknown title)：House Hokkaido Stew Cream CM song.
Tsuzure ori - so far and yet so close -(つづれ織り 〜)：Japan Fm Network Niigata disaster campaign theme song.
Scream (Glay X Exile)：TBS Television 50th anniversary  "Doors" special theme song.
Dareka no Tameni Ikiru (誰かの為に生きる)：TBS Television' J Sports "Super Soccer Plus" theme song.
Natsuoto (夏音)：TBS Television's show "Aisuru Hani Kami! (恋するハニカミ!)" theme song.
Henna Yume - Thousand Dreams- (変な夢〜): "Modern Amusement" clothing CM song.
Kodō (鼓動)：main theme song of the movie "Taitei no Ken (大帝の剣)"
Ashes - 1969-：Asahi Television "Adorena!Garejii" ending theme.
Starless Night: NTV's Soccer programs image song / "Eclipse" Fujitsu CM song.
Verb：NTV's "Music Fighter" opening theme /"music.jp" TV CM song.
Aka to Kuro no Matadora  (紅と黒のMatadora)：Japanese theme of Korean movie "Shukumei".
I Love you o Sagashiteru (I Love Youをさがしてる)：Asahi Television's drama "Dageki Tenshi Ruri (打撃天使ルリ)" opening theme. 
Haru made wa (春までは)："Toyota Prius" CM song.
I Am XXX: theme song for the movie Blood: The Last Vampire
Let Me Be: theme song for the movie documentary "Isamu Katayama - Artisanal Life"
Synchronicity: theme song for Xbox 360 game Magna Carta 2.
Satellite of love: theme song for the short animated film "Je t'aime".

Notes
  Glay official homepage. Happy Swing Space Site.
  Oricon official homepage. Oricon Style''.
 DVD sales information: http://jbbs.livedoor.jp/bbs/read.cgi/music/3914/1057507128/

References

Discographies of Japanese artists
Rock music group discographies